The Jacques Plante Memorial Trophy is awarded annually to the goaltender in the Quebec Major Junior Hockey League with the best goals-against average. It is named for Hockey Hall of Fame goaltender Jacques Plante.

Winners

References

External links
 QMJHL official site List of trophy winners.

Quebec Major Junior Hockey League trophies and awards
Ice hockey goaltender awards